Velddrif (the name of the town) or Velddrift (the name of the farm on which the town was established), is a coastal fishing town in the Bergrivier Local Municipality, Western Cape, South Africa. The town had a population 7800 in 2007 and is located on the estuary at which the Berg River flows into St. Helena Bay.

Geography and environment
The R27 joins the R399 at Velddrif, which is near the point at which that the meandering Berg River flows into the sea at St. Helena Bay. The estuary is an important bird habitat and is home to around 30,000 birds, including up to 80 species which are endemic to the Cape coast. Well over 350 different species of birds can be seen here, as it is a habitat for sea, river and land birds.

Flowers grow in this area, including the Euclea racemosa (Kersbos), Babiana ringens (Rotstert), Willdenowia incurvata (Sonkwas Riet), Limonium (Strandroos) and Leucospermum rodolentum (Sandveld Luisebos). Regular boat trips can be taken up the river for birdwatching.

History
The name Velddrif is derived from a drift in the field through which a local farmer, Theunis Smit, took his stock to access grazing across the Berg River. In 1899, a pont (pontoon ferry) was built to cross the Berg River.

Economy
The main industries of Velddrif are fishing, tourism and salt production. There are two large salt works in the town that provide much of the salt in the Western Cape. The fishing industry is substantial in Velddrif; the town is part of the Crayfish Route. A common sight in the area are the rickety wooden jetties on which the dried fish speciality, bokkoms, is hung out to dry. The town contains Port Owen, which comprises 100 hectares and has 3.5 km of waterways.

The town attracts a number of tourists, especially for its wildlife, fishing, yachting and art galleries, which represents the work of over 100 artists and craftsmen in the area. Birdwatching is a significant component of the town's tourism sector, as the Berg River Estuary, next to the town, is famous as a rare bird hotspot with over 200 species found in the 24,000 ha wetland.

There are numerous restaurants in Velddrif and nearby Laaiplek that serve fresh fish and other seafood. A holiday resort has grown up around the marina area of Port Owen and Admiral Island Security Village. The annual Berg River Canoe Marathon starts in Paarl and ends at the Carinus Bridge Velddrif. The first Berg River Canoe Marathon was held in 1962, has gained a reputation for being one of the toughest courses in the world  and isthe longest course in South Africa.  Ayesha Abdool Aziz, who hails from Edgemead Primary, holds the current record for the group aged under 9.

References

Populated places in the Bergrivier Local Municipality
Populated places founded by Afrikaners